In the classification of programming languages, an applicative programming language is built out of functions applied to arguments. Applicative languages are functional, and applicative is often used as a synonym for functional. However, concatenative languages can be functional, while not being applicative.

The semantics of applicative languages are based on beta reduction of terms, and side effects such as mutation of state are not permitted.

Lisp and ML are applicative programming languages.

See also
 Applicative universal grammar
 Function-level programming

References

Programming language classification
Applicative computing systems